Swansea Airport  is located in the middle of Fairwood Common on the Gower Peninsula  to the west of Swansea, Wales.

Operations
Swansea Airport has a CAA Ordinary Licence (Number P867) that allows flights for the public transport of passengers or for flying instruction as authorised by the licensee, fixed wing light aircraft experience flights and flying lessons are conducted by the Cambrian flying club LTD, microlight flying lessons are also conducted by the Gower flight centre.  The airport has two runways: 04/22 and 10/28. A part of the disused runway 15/33 is now used as taxiway Bravo.

The airport is mainly used to handle helicopters and privately owned aircraft. The Wales Air Ambulance used to operate from the airport but has now moved to a purpose-built site

The airport is also used by corporate aircraft including police, military and naval helicopters.

Several small general aviation companies conduct fixed-wing pilot training; and parachuting operations; from the airport.

On 17 January 2023, it was announced that Swansea Airport would begin running scheduled services later in the year. This was subsequently announced as a route between Swansea and Exeter from the end of March 2023, with plans for additional routes later in the year.

Facilities
Located on the eastern part of the site is the airport's only terminal building. The control tower is integrated into the terminal building. The airport has two hangars. The airport is covered by CAT1 fire cover.

The airport may be reached via the A4118, running through the Gower Peninsula. Being quite distant from any major routes and having to use mainly suburban roads, it takes approximately 20 minutes to reach from the nearest M4 junction.

History
Swansea Airport was built on what was originally common land during the Second World War. The aerodrome was declared operational on 15 June 1941 as RAF Fairwood Common, after taking nearly a year to develop. It was built as a day and night fighter station within 10 Group RAF Fighter Command. The aerodrome became a sector station in October 1941, taking on the responsibility for the air defence of South and West Wales including shipping in the Bristol and St George's Channels.

The aerodrome fulfilled a variety of military roles during the Second World War, with the addition of an Armament Practice Camp in October 1943 which expanded into an Armament Practice Station in July 1945 following which it went into 'care and maintenance' in October 1946. Finally decommissioned by the RAF in spring 1949, private flying started in July 1949 with the formation of Swansea Flying Club at the renamed Fairwood Common Airfield. The airfield hosted a number of air races and motor/motorcycle races but it was not until 1957 that Swansea Corporation allowed Cambrian Airways to run the airport for them on a commercial basis. Renamed Swansea Airport, it was officially opened on 1 June 1957 with Cambrian Airways inaugural flight arriving from Jersey. Then in the following 12 years, a variety of airlines operated through the airport with varying degrees of success. Cambrian Airways operated services to Jersey and Guernsey; and Morton Air Services operated a service to Gatwick. Scheduled regular flights then ceased in 1969. During the 1970s and 1980s, mostly ad hoc and summer charter flights continued to operate, mainly by Dan Air/Skyways. However, for a period at the end of the 1970s Air Anglia flew a Piper PA-31 Navajo Chieftain on a year-round scheduled service linking Norwich and Newquay via Birmingham and Swansea.

The 1990s saw the arrival of Heli-air Wales to the airport, and so began the era of Helicopter Training in South Wales. In April 2000, Swansea entrepreneur Martin Morgan via his company Jaxx Landing Ltd., bought the remaining lease. Ambitious plans were put in place to upgrade the then run-down facilities. The airport changed ownership again in 2003, when the Morgans sold their interest in the airport to Swansea Airport Limited, owned by Air Wales owner and director Roy Thomas, who was appointed CEO of the airport company.

With the take over of the airport by Jaxx Landing, activity at the airport began to increase: the Welsh Air Ambulance service based a MBB Bö 105 helicopter at the airport in March 2001. In August 2001, gliders of 636 VGS moved from Aberporth back to Swansea Airport. In March 2016 636 VGS was disbanded and the Wales Air Ambulance helicopter moved to a new base in Dafen, Llanelli at the end of May 2016

Air Wales used the airport between October 2001 and October 2004, offering flights to Dublin, Cork, Amsterdam, Jersey and London. However, the venture was not successful. After 18 months of operation, Air Wales's owner Roy Thomas had invested more than £3.25 million of his personal fortune into the airport. The venture received only one tenth of the passengers needed to make the business viable. The final straw came when the United Kingdom Civil Aviation Authority demanded that the airport's landing lights be improved at a cost of £350,000. Roy Thomas decided to pull out of Swansea Airport and concentrate Air Wales's operations at Cardiff International Airport instead.
Since 29 October 2004, there have been no scheduled flights operating from the airport.

From 2008 to 2011 the airport was the base for the Yak-52 formation aerobatic team 'Team Osprey'. In Spring 2014 a new formation aerobatic team was formed at the airport with Vans aircraft, Team Raven displaying in the 2014 and 2015 air show seasons with 5 aircraft increasing to 6 by mid-July 2016.

Development of the airport
The Welsh Assembly Government is conducting studies into improving the facilities at the airport as part of the transport infrastructure development strategy for the whole of Wales. These improvements may require some public sector support. Development proposals include: a new terminal building, new hangars, upgraded operating facilities, new fencing and a new access road.

There has been widespread local opposition against the idea of further development of the airport. The main concerns are: the impact on the internationally important Special Area of Conservation which almost surrounds the airport; noise from the increased number of flights at the airport; and the negative impact of the development of the airport on the local scenery, since Gower is a designated Area of Outstanding Natural Beauty. In addition, the undulating and boggy common land beyond the airport perimeter fence to the North East makes extension of the runway (Runway 04/22) difficult.

Statistics

References

External links

Airports in Wales
History of Swansea
Sports venues in Swansea
Buildings and structures in Swansea
Pennard (community)
Transport in Swansea